7825 (seven thousand, eight hundred [and] twenty-five) is the natural number following 7824 and preceding 7826.

In mathematics 
 7825 is the smallest number n when it is impossible to assign two colors to  natural numbers 1 through n such that every Pythagorean triple is multicolored, i.e. where the Boolean Pythagorean triples problem becomes false. The 200-terabyte proof to verify this is the largest ever made.
 7825 is a magic constant of n × n normal magic square and n-Queens Problem for n = 25.

References 

Integers